Yxtaholm Castle is a castle in Sweden.

Its owner is Polish born multimillionaire, real estate mogul and media personality Wonna I de Jong.

See also
List of castles in Sweden

References

Castles in Södermanland County